Six-Fours-les-Plages (Sièis Four in provençal), is a commune in the Var department in the Provence-Alpes-Côte d'Azur region in southeastern France. Inhabitants of Six-Fours-les-Plages refer to themselves as "Six-Fournais".

It is located in the Métropole Toulon Provence Méditerranée, and is southwest of the main city of Toulon.

Features
The city offers several points of interest. The fort on the hill that dominates the city neighbours an eleventh-century chapel, St Peter "collégiale". There are also nice beaches from the very popular "brutal beach", famous for windsurfing to the secret cove in the Sicié massif. The Île des Embiez is the site of an oceanographic research centre, and the smaller Île Gaou is where concerts are organised every summer.

Population

Notable people from Six-Fours-les-Plages
Jean-Claude Mas – founder of Poly Implant Prothèse (PIP), breast implant manufacturer.
Hélène Ségara – pop singer.
Nolan Seveyras

International relations 

  Emmendingen, Germany

  Zagarolo, Italy

See also
Communes of the Var department

References

External links

 six-fours-les-plages.com

Communes of Var (department)